Where to Find Your Law is a book by Ernest Arthur Jelf, M.A. It is a bibliography of law.

The First Edition was published in 1897, the Second in 1900 and the Third in 1907.

In 1897, the Westminster Review said:

In 1907, the Law Magazine and Review said of the third edition:

In 1914, Percy Winfield said that this book was a "valuable" guide "to the materials of English law".

References
Jelf, Ernest Arthur. Where to Find Your Law. Third Edition. Horace Cox. London. 1907. Google Books.

Legal bibliographies
1897 books